Tripp House and Store Complex is a historic home and general store complex located at Durham in Greene County, New York.  The complex includes the Tripp House (c. 1830), the Original Tripp Store (c. 1830) and 1888 Tripp Store, a barn (c. 1830), Outhouse (c. 1870), and two outbuildings / sheds (c. 1890).  The house is a 2-story, five by two-bay, central hall, single pile plan brick dwelling.  It sits on a stone foundation and is surmounted by a steep gable roof.  The 1888 Tripp Store is a four- by eight-bay, -story wood frame commercial / residential structure.  It features a 2-story Victorian-era porch.  It incorporates the Original Tripp Store, a 2-story timber-frame building, as a rear storage section.

It was listed on the National Register of Historic Places in 2001.

Gallery

References

External links

I.U. Tripp & Co.  Antiques and Collectibles

Houses on the National Register of Historic Places in New York (state)
Commercial buildings on the National Register of Historic Places in New York (state)
Queen Anne architecture in New York (state)
Federal architecture in New York (state)
Houses completed in 1830
Houses in Greene County, New York
1830 establishments in New York (state)
National Register of Historic Places in Greene County, New York